Steve Kuhn Live in New York is a live album by American jazz pianist and composer Steve Kuhn recorded in 1972 and originally released on the Cobblestone label but rereleased as Raindrops on the Muse label.

Reception
The Allmusic review by Ron Wynn awarded the album 3 stars stating "Pianist Steve Kuhn's greatest attributes are his steady, sometimes impressive phrasing and interpretative ability; his weak links are a less than intense rhythmic capability and a derivative style. That's overcome on this session mainly because he's playing with a sympathetic rhythm section".

Track listing
All compositions by Steve Kuhn except as indicated
 "Gloria" (Bronisław Kaper) - 5:05  
 "The Child Is Gone" - 3:00  
 "The Real Guitarist (In The House)" - 7:47  
 "The Saga of Harrison Crabfeathers" - 5:20  
 "Chicken Feathers" - 6:37  
 "Ida Lupino"  (Carla Bley) - 4:10  
 "Raindrops, Raindrops" - 4:30  
 "Thoughts of a Gentleman" - 3:06

Personnel
Steve Kuhn - piano
George Mraz - bass
Bruce Ditmas - drums
Sue Evans - percussion

References

Cobblestone Records live albums
Steve Kuhn live albums
1972 live albums
Muse Records live albums